The 1986 German Open, also known by its sponsored name Ebel German Open, was a men's tennis tournament of the 1986 Nabisco Grand Prix and played on outdoor red clay courts. It was the 77th edition of the event. It took place at the Am Rothenbaum in Hamburg, West Germany, from 15 September through 21 September 1986. Fourth-seeded Henri Leconte won the singles title.

Finals

Singles

 Henri Leconte defeated  Miloslav Mečíř, 6–2, 5–7, 6–4, 6–2
 It was Leconte's 2nd singles title of the year and the 6th of his career.

Doubles
 Emilio Sánchez /  Sergio Casal defeated  Boris Becker /  Eric Jelen, 6–1, 7–5

References

External links
   
 Association of Tennis Professionals (ATP) tournament profile
 International Federation (ITF) tournament editions details

German Open
Hamburg European Open
1986 in West German sport
German